1+1 is a mathematical expression that evaluates to:
 2 (number) (in ordinary arithmetic)
 1 (number) (in Boolean algebra with a notation where '+' denotes a logical disjunction)
 0 (number) (in Boolean algebra with a notation where '+' denotes 'exclusive or' operation, or in a quotient ring of numbers modulo 2)

The terms 1+1, One Plus One, or One and One may refer to:

1+1 
1 + 1 + 1 + 1 + ⋯, a mathematical divergent series
1+1 (TV channel), a Ukrainian TV channel
1+1 (Grin album), 1972
1+1 (Herbie Hancock and Wayne Shorter album), 1997
"1+1" (song), by Beyoncé Knowles
"1+1", a 2021 song by Sia from Music

One Plus One 
OnePlus One, an Android smartphone
One Plus One, original title of Jean-Luc Godard's 1968 film Sympathy for the Devil
One Plus One, 2002 graphic novel published by Oni Press
One Plus One (TV programme), a weekly interview show aired by ABC in Australia
Unomásuno (English: One Plus One), a Mexican newspaper

One and One
 One and One (musical), an American 1970s off-Broadway musical comedy (also known as One & One)
 One and One (song), written by Billy Steinberg, Rick Nowels and Marie-Claire D'Ubaldo and notably covered by Robert Miles feat. Maria Nayler
 "One and One (Ain't I Good Enough)", a 1987 song by Wa Wa Nee
 One-and-one, a type of free throw in basketball
 Fish and chips, in Dublin slang

Other
 1&1 Internet, a web hosting company
1 and 1 (SHINee album), a 2016 reissue of their album 1 of 1

See also
 One and One Is One (disambiguation)
 One Plus One Is One, a 2004 album by Badly Drawn Boy
 One on One (disambiguation)
 One by One (disambiguation)